The Brickell Memorial is an outdoor monument commemorating Columbus, Ohio's first citizen, John Brickell. The work was installed in 1930 in the present-day Alexander AEP Park in Columbus, Ohio, United States.

Description
The memorial features a bronze plaque on a stone, which rests on a concrete base. The plaque has an inscription: 

The stone measures approximately 53 x 44 x 24 inches, the plaque is approximately 30 inches tall by 24 inches wide, and the base measures approximately 7 x 48 x 36 inches.

History
The memorial was installed in 1930. It was surveyed by the Smithsonian Institution's "Save Outdoor Sculpture!" program in 1992.

References

1930 establishments in Ohio
Downtown Columbus, Ohio
Monuments and memorials in Ohio